Kevin Christopher Riley is an American politician. A Democrat, he serves as the New York City Councilmember for the 12th district. The district includes Wakefield, Olinville, Edenwald, Eastchester, Williamsbridge, Baychester, Co-op City in The Bronx.

Early life and education 
Riley grew up and lives in Baychester, The Bronx. He graduated from Mount Saint Michael Academy in Wakefield before attending State University of New York at Old Westbury where he received a B.A. and an M.P.A. from Metropolitan College of New York. He has two daughters and one son.

Career 
Prior to running for office, Riley was an aide to Assembly Speaker Carl Heastie for ten years. He was also a Democratic Male District Leader for the 83rd Assembly District.

New York City Council 
On December 22, 2020, Riley won a special election in the 12th district following the expulsion of Council Member Andy King. He was sworn in on January 6, 2021, and named chair of the Subcommittee on Landmarks, Public Sitings, and Dispositions.

Election history 
Riley outraised his opponents and received a significant amount of endorsements from high-ranking elected official and unions, which some attributed to his close relationship to Assembly Speaker Carl Heastie, one of the most powerful politicians in the State.

References 

1987 births
Living people
New York City Council members
New York (state) Democrats
Politicians from the Bronx
21st-century American politicians
State University of New York at Old Westbury alumni